San Francisco del Chañar is a town in Córdoba Province in Argentina. It is the head town of the Sobremonte Department

External links

Populated places in Córdoba Province, Argentina
Cities in Argentina
Córdoba Province, Argentina
Argentina